The Fireboat Station in Tacoma, Washington, built in 1928, was listed on the National Register of Historic Places in 1986.  It was the base for three fireboats.

The station was deemed "significant for its association with the development of Tacoma's port/industrial district and the growth of the city's vital municipal services. The station is also an important local example of innovations in fire station design that followed the motorization of firefighting equipment."

It was the city's smallest fire station, and a picturesque one.  It was designed by architect Morton J. Nicholson, and is Craftsman in style.

Built in 1928 as part of a bond-funded project that built three other stations, as well as the Fire Alarm Station.  While fireboats were still housed there in 2008, the station itself was no longer staffed.

Gallery

See also
Lambeth Fire Station, London, England, with its River station for fireboats

References

External links

Fire stations on the National Register of Historic Places in Washington (state)
National Register of Historic Places in Tacoma, Washington
Buildings and structures completed in 1928